Mirey Brook is a  stream in northern Massachusetts and southwestern New Hampshire in the United States. It is a tributary of the Ashuelot River, itself a tributary of the Connecticut River, which flows to Long Island Sound.

Mirey Brook begins in the town of Warwick, Massachusetts, at the outlet of a wetland at the northern base of Mount Grace. It flows north to the head of Sunny Valley, where it receives Mountain Brook and Kidder Brook from the southeast. Continuing north, the brook enters the town limits of Winchester, New Hampshire, just as the valley changes from steep and narrow to flat and wide. The brook reaches the Ashuelot River at the village of Winchester.

State Route 78 follows Mirey Brook from its confluence with Mountain Brook to its mouth at the Ashuelot.

A major tributary of Mirey Brook is Roaring Brook, which enters from the east near the village of Scotland, New Hampshire.

See also

List of rivers of Massachusetts
List of rivers of New Hampshire

References

Rivers of New Hampshire
Rivers of Franklin County, Massachusetts
Tributaries of the Connecticut River
Rivers of Massachusetts
Rivers of Cheshire County, New Hampshire